Saint John's Church, Männistö, is a Lutheran church in the Männistö neighborhood in the city of  Kuopio. The church was designed by architect Juha Leiviskä together with Pekka Kivisalo, and completed in 1992. The interior of the church features an altarpiece by artist Markku Pääkkönen.

References

External links

Buildings and structures in Kuopio
Lutheran churches in Finland
Juha Leiviskä buildings
Churches completed in 1992
Modernist architecture in Finland